is a retired Japanese professional shogi player who achieved the rank of 9-dan.

Promotion history
The promotion history for Naitō is as follows:
1954: 6-kyū
1956: 1-dan
1958, October 1: 4-dan
1961, April 1: 5-Dan
1962, April 1: 6-dan
1963, April 1: 7-dan
1967, April 1: 8-dan
1974, February 4: 9-dan 
2015, March 31: Retired

Titles and other championships
Naitō appeared in major title matches a total of thirteen times and has won four major titles. He has won the Kisei and Ōi titles twice each. In addition to major titles, Naitō won thirteen other shogi championships during his career.

Awards and honors
Naitō has received a number of awards and honors throughout his career for his accomplishments both on an off the shogi board. These include awards given out annually by the Japan Shogi Association (JSA) for performance in official games as well as other JSA awards for career accomplishments, and awards received from governmental organizations, etc. for contributions made to Japanese society.

Annual Shogi Awards
1st Annual Awards (April 1973March 1974): Technique Award
10th Annual Awards (April 1982March 1983): Technique Award
22nd Annual Awards (April 1994March 1995): Masuda Award (for the Side Pawn Capture, Bishop-33 variation)

Other awards
1979: Shogi Honor Award (Awarded by the JSA in recognition of winning 600 official games as a professional)
1983: 25 Years Service Award (Awarded by the JSA in recognition of being an active professional for twenty-five years)
1983, September: Kobe Culture Special Award
1987: Shogi Honor Fighting-spirit Award (Awarded by JSA in recognition of winning 800 official games as a professional)
1991, November: Nishinomiya Citizen's Culture Award
1998: 40 Years Service Award (Awarded by the JSA in recognition of being an active professional for forty years)
2000: Special Shogi Honor Award (Awarded by the JSA in recognition of winning 1,000 official games as a professional)
2000, November: Hyōgo Prefecture Honor Award
2008: 50 Years Service Award (Awarded by the JSA in recognition of being an active professional for fifty years)
2010: Order of the Rising Sun with Gold and Silver Rays

References

External links
ShogiHub: Professional Player Info · Naito, Kunio

Japanese shogi players
Living people
Retired professional shogi players
Japanese male singers
Enka singers
People from Kobe
Professional shogi players from Hyōgo Prefecture
Recipients of the Order of the Rising Sun
Recipients of the Kōzō Masuda Award
Ōi (shogi)
Kisei (shogi)
1939 births